Manuel Rojas may refer to:

Manuel Rojas (independence leader) (1831–1903), Venezuelan born Puerto Rican independence leader in the El Grito de Lares revolt against Spanish colonial rule
Manuel Rojas (author) (1896–1973), Chilean writer 
Manuel Rojas (footballer) (born 1954), retired football midfielder from Chile 
Manuel Rojas (cinematographer) (1930–1995), Goya award-winning Spanish cinematographer